So You Think You Can Dance is a South African televised dance competition with a format based on the American show by the same name. Hosted by Sade Giliberti, the series premièred in 2008, and is into its third season, taking a hiatus between seasons two (2010) and three (2013). The show is presented mostly in English and the winner of the competition receives cash and prizes in the amount of around 250,000 Rand

See also
Dance on television

References 

2007 South African television series debuts
2013 South African television series endings
SABC 1 original programming
So You Think You Can Dance
South African reality television series
South African television series based on American television series